Estelle Quérard (born ) is a French female former volleyball player, playing as a libero. She was part of the France women's national volleyball team.

She competed at the 2009 Women's European Volleyball Championship. On club level she played for ES Le Cannet in 2009.

References

External links
http://www.cev.lu/Competition-Area/PlayerDetails.aspx?TeamID=7577&PlayerID=4815&ID=552

1979 births
Living people
French women's volleyball players
Place of birth missing (living people)